The West Caucasian tur (Capra caucasica) is a mountain-dwelling goat-antelope native to the western half of the Caucasus Mountains range, in Georgia and European Russia. It is listed as Endangered on the IUCN Red List, as the wild population is estimated to be between 5,000 and 6,000 individuals.

Names
It is also known by the names "zebuder," "zac" and "Caucasian ibex."

Description

They have large but narrow bodies and short legs. West Caucasian turs have a chestnut coat with a yellow underbelly and darker legs. Their horns are scimitar-shaped and heavily ridged.

Habitat

Predators
They are preyed upon by steppe wolves and lynxes; Persian leopards and Syrian brown bears may also be possible predators.

Behaviour
The West Caucasian tur is nocturnal, eating in the open at night, and sheltering during the day. Females live in herds of around 10 individuals, while males are solitary.

See also
 Caucasus mixed forests
 East Caucasian tur
 Capra dalii

References

External links 
 Capra caucasica on ultimate ungulate web

Capra (genus)
Mammals of Europe
Tur, Caucasian, West
Mammals described in 1783
Taxa named by Johann Anton Güldenstädt